The Faculty of Humanities and Social Sciences (HaSS) is one of four faculties at the University of Strathclyde. The faculty was formed in August 2010 from the merger of the Faculty of Education with the Faculty of Law, Arts and Social Sciences.

It is the largest faculty in the University and the restructuring saw some significant changes to the courses on offer.

Since it was formed the faculty has been headed by the Dean, Professor Tony McGrew.

Schools

The faculty is divided into six schools.

School of Social Work and Social Policy

The school hosts the Centre for Excellence for Looked After Children in Scotland (CELCIS) and the Centre for Youth and Criminal Justice.

School of Education

The School offers a wide variety of honours and master's degrees such as Primary Education, Education and Social Sciences, Childhood Practice and Teaching with (Chemistry, Mathematics or Physics).

School of Government and Public Policy

Established in 2010 by the merger of the Department of Government and Public Policy with three research centres - the European Policies Research Centre, the Centre for the Study of Public Policy and the Centre for Elections and Representation Studies.

Andrew Goudie is a visiting professor at the faculty.

School of Humanities

The School researches historical and contemporary culture.

Law School

Strathclyde Law School was established in 1964. In 2011 the school announced they would be developing a masters in advocacy, the first course of its kind in the UK.

School of Psychological Sciences and Health

The School provides teaching in the following areas Psychology, Speech and Language Therapy, Physical Activity for Health, and Counselling.

Humanities and Social Sciences Quarter 
The Lord Hope and Curran buildings underwent a £14m redevelopment by the architect firm Sheppard Robson. The extensive refurbishment and alteration allowed the building to become a major part of the university's new Humanities and Social Sciences Quarter.

Moving staff into the new facilities allowed the University to close their Jordanhill site, where their education faculty had been based since 1993.

References

External links

University of Strathclyde